Cassa di Risparmio di Biella e Vercelli S.p.A. known as BiverBanca, is an Italian saving bank based in Biella, Piedmont. It was acquired by fellow Piedmontese bank Cassa di Risparmio di Asti from Banca Monte dei Paschi di Siena in 2012. BiverBanca had almost all the branches in Piedmont and Aosta Valley, especially in the area around Biella and Vercelli : 46 branches in the Province of Biella (11 alone in Biella) and 46 branches in the Province of Vercelli (8 alone in Vercelli), 10 in Turin and 6 in the Province Novara; 3 in the Province of Alessandria; 5 branches in Aosta Valley; 1 branch in the Province of Verbano-Cusio-Ossola, and lastly 1 branch in Milan, the financial hub of Italy.

The bank did not serve the Province of Asti, which was served by the parent company instead, as well as the Province of Cuneo, Piedmont.

Timeline
1994 Cassa di Risparmio di Biella merged with Cassa di Risparmio di Vercelli to form Cassa di Risparmio di Biella e Vercelli (BiverBanca) C.R. Vercelli Foundation held 26.2% stake and C.R. Biella Foundation held 73.8% stake
1997 Banca Commerciale Italiana acquired 55% shares from the banking foundations
1999 Became part of Banca Intesa Group
2007 Acquired by Banca Monte dei Paschi di Siena (BMPS) from Intesa Sanpaolo (55%) for about €399 million; C.R. Biella Foundation retained 33.22% and C.R. Vercelli Foundation 11.78% 
2008 Re-capitalization, BMPS held 59%, C.R. Biella Foundation held 35% and C.R. Vercelli Foundation held 6%
2010 Acquired branches from sister bank Banca Antonveneta; new ownership ratio changed to BMPS (60.42%), C.R. Biella Foundation 33.44% and C.R. Vercelli Foundation 6.14%.
2012 Acquired by Cassa di Risparmio di Asti from BMPS for about €205.5 million (for 60.42% stake)

See also
other saving bank from the provincial capital of Piedmont
 Cassa di Risparmio di Alessandria, now part of Banco BPM
 Cassa di Risparmio di Cuneo, now part of UBI Banca
 Cassa di Risparmio di Torino, now part of UniCredit

References

External links
 http://www.biverbanca.it/

Banks established in 1994
Italian companies established in 1994
Banks of Italy
Companies based in Biella
Vercelli
Former Montepaschi subsidiaries